Wim Lakenberg (19 April 1921 – 19 May 1991) was a Dutch footballer. He played in one match for the Netherlands national football team in 1947.

References

External links
 

1921 births
1991 deaths
Dutch footballers
Netherlands international footballers
Place of birth missing
Association footballers not categorized by position